Merrion is a former railway station in Dublin. The disused station building lies to the immediate south of Merrion Gates on the DART line. The station originally opened in early 1835, shortly after the completion of the Dublin and Kingstown Railway line. It closed in 1935.

References

Disused railway stations in County Dublin
Railway stations in the Republic of Ireland opened in 1835
Railway stations in the Republic of Ireland opened in 1862
Railway stations in the Republic of Ireland opened in 1882
Railway stations in Ireland closed in 1901
Railway stations in the Republic of Ireland opened in 1928
Railway stations in Ireland closed in 1929
Railway stations in the Republic of Ireland opened in 1930
Railway stations in Ireland closed in 1935